Six ships of the Royal Navy have been named HMS Torch:

, a fireship, purchased in 1804 and sold in 1807
, formerly the French Torche captured in 1805, renamed but never commissioned. She was broken up in 1811.
, launched in 1845 and sold in 1856.
, a  launched in 1859 and broken up in 1881.
, an  sloop launched in 1894. She was transferred to the New Zealand government in 1917 as Firebrand.
, a  launched in 1918 and sold in 1929.

In addition one vessel of the Royal Maritime Auxiliary Service has been named Torch
, a torpedo recovery vessel launched in 1979 and sold in 1999.

References

Royal Navy ship names